The Departmental Council of Manche is the deliberative assembly of the Manche department in the region of Normandy. It consists of 54 members (general councilors) from 27 cantons and its headquarters are in Saint-Lô.

The President of the General Council is Jean Morin.

Vice-Presidents 
The President of the Departmental Council is assisted by 10 vice-presidents chosen from among the departmental advisers. Each of them has a delegation of authority.

References 

Manche
Manche